"Prayed for You" is a song recorded by American country music singer Matt Stell. It is his debut single and appears on his debut extended play Everywhere but On. Stell co-wrote the song with Ash Bowers, with whom he co-produced it, and Allison Veltz.

Content
Stell wrote the song with Allison Veltz and Ash Bowers. According to Stell, Veltz presented himself and Ash with the lyric "Didn’t know you from Adam, it was more than I could fathom, but I prayed for you" when the two were waiting for Bowers to arrive at a writing session. He told the site PopCulture.com that "We took off from there, and kind of infused it with our own relationship experiences, and not only relationships; the song is about a relationship, but it's also about persevering, in anything, whether it's school, work, family, just hanging in there long enough to allow good things to happen." The song appears on Stell's debut EP, Everywhere but On.

Critical reception
In Digital Journal, Markos Papadatos wrote that, "Stell’s song is meaningful and its lyrics are pure poetry." Robert K. Oermann of MusicRow gave the single a mixed review, stating that "The winsome song is well crafted, and he sings with gusto. The paint-by-numbers production does nothing for me."

Commercial performance
"Prayed for You" reached No. 1 on Billboards Country Airplay chart dated October 12, 2019.  It was certified Platinum by the RIAA on September 18, 2019. The song has sold 134,000 copies in the United States as of December 2019.

Music video
The music video for the song first premiered at People on July 9, 2018 and stars reality TV star Savannah Chrisley and her fiancé, hockey player Nic Kerdiles.

A man in his pickup truck (played by Nic), parked at a church, glances one last time at a photo of him and his ex-girlfriend, before swiftly tossing it out his window. The pastor of the church soon comes out and greets him, and a woman inside (played by Savannah) greets him as well. The pastor instructs the two what needs to be cleaned in the church and leaves. Soon after they begin cleaning, however, the two begin flirting by throwing rags at each other (as well as spraying one another). When the pastor walks in to check on them, the two have thrown rags all over the church, making a mess. The pastor walks away with a stern expression on his face.

The two soon finish cleaning, with the pastor thanking the man, and drive off in the man's pickup truck, holding hands. Later in the evening, the two head to a Matt Stell concert, still holding hands, where he is performing the song. When it ends, the two kiss.

Charts

Weekly charts

Year-end charts

Certifications

References

2019 debut singles
2019 songs
Matt Stell songs
Songs written by Ash Bowers
Arista Nashville singles